Chimel may refer to:
Chimel v. California, the United States Supreme Court case
 Laj Chimel, a small town in Guatemala

People with the surname
 Tony Chimel, American wrestling announcer